Hamilton North is an inner suburb of Newcastle, New South Wales, Australia, located  west of Newcastle's central business district.

References

Suburbs of Newcastle, New South Wales